"Ex for a Reason" is a song by American singer Summer Walker with rapper JT of hip hop duo City Girls, released on October 15, 2021, as the lead single from Walker's second studio album, Still Over It (2021).

Background and composition
"Ex for a Reason" is an uptempo pop-rap song that conveys "emotions behind dating someone that’s moved on from a past relationship". Walker first announced the song via a teaser trailer on October 4, 2021. Walker revealed its artwork, along with the release date as October 15.

Andy Kellman of AllMusic described the song as "a Miami-meets-Atlanta bass jam and one of the era's most flavorsome crossover R&B hits."

Music video
A lyric video was released to accompany the release of "Ex for a Reason" on October 15, 2021. The official music video, directed by Lacy Duke, was released on October 19, 2021. The video begins with Summer and her friends sitting at a local gas station and then riding through Atlanta, Georgia in an Oldsmobile 442 convertible with "Forever Atlanta" on the license plate, before later arriving to a house party. JT is seen rapping her verse while standing in front of a mirror.

Charts

Weekly charts

Year-end charts

References

2021 songs
2021 singles
Interscope Records singles
Miami bass songs
Songs written by London on da Track
Songs written by Nija Charles
Songs written by Sean Garrett
Songs written by Buddah Bless
Song recordings produced by Buddah Bless